La Escuela de Lancaster A.C. is a private school in Tlalpan, Mexico City. Its two campuses Plantel Diligencias in Colonia San Pedro Mártir, and Plantel Rey Yupanqui in Colonia Tlalcoligia, house middle through high school, and preschool through elementary school, respectively.

References

External links
La Escuela de Lancaster A.C.

Tlalpan
High schools in Mexico City